Beatless is a Japanese science fiction serial novel written by Satoshi Hase and illustrated by Redjuice. The series has inspired three spin-off manga series and a 24-episode anime television series by Diomedéa, which aired from January to September 2018 in the Animeism programming block on MBS.

Plot
In 2105, with the large scale advancement of technology, hIE's (Humanoid Interface Elements) are human-like-robots invented in the year 2057. hIEs are used as public and personal servants for society. One person, a high school student named Arato Endo, treats hIEs like humans and sees them as equals, and though he wished to buy one, his financial situation hinders him from doing so. In the middle of the night, while returning home from a grocery store run, he is violently attacked by a hIE. Seconds from death, Lacia, an abnormal hIE equipped with a weaponized coffin, comes to his aid and saves his life. In the chaos that follows, a hacked electric car threatens to run them over, and Lacia makes a deal with Arato, to assume ownership of her in exchange for her saving his life. The deal requires him to take full responsibility for her actions, to which he reluctantly agrees. Lacia warns the entranced Arato she, like all hIE's, doesn't have a soul. After owning Lacia, and bringing her home, Lacia enjoys her new, peaceful lifestyle, while Arato is dragged into a series of major events; from being hired by a company that hosts an online fashion modeling audition, to being dragged into the fighting between other escaped hIE's from Memeframe.

Characters

 Arato is the main protagonist of Beatless and a high school student, who shows sympathy to hIEs, treating them as humans. He was nearly killed by a hijacked hIE and an electric car while on his way back home from the grocery store and was saved by Lacia, whose deal he later accepted in exchange for her becoming his property.

 Lacia is an android/hIE equipped with a bullet-stopping device and is the main female protagonist of the series. As the Type-005 Lacia-class, she is one of 5 specialized hIEs who escaped the clutches of the Memeframe corporation. She becomes Arato's property after saving his life from  a hIE and an electric car.

She is the main antagonist of the Beatless series, and a supporting character of the anime adaptation. She is the Type-001 of the Lacia series and she is among the 5 Lacia-type hIEs who escaped the Tokyo Research Facility of Memeframe. She is also known as the Crimson Fog.

The Lacia-series Type-002 hIE and one of the 5 specialized hIEs who escaped the facility, she specializes in creating mini-drones, in the form of flower petals that hack technology. She is one of the secondary antagonists in the series.
 / 

Saturnus, a.k.a. Mariage, is the Type-003 Lacia-series hIE, and among the 5 hIEs  to escape from the Memeframe corporation. She is one of the female protagonists. She was owned by Erica Burrows after Saturnus destroyed many hIEs, which proved Burrows worthy of her power.

Methode is the another antagonist of the series. As a finished model of the Type 004-Lacia series, her personality is manipulative, and ruthless. Her owner is Ryo Kaidai, and she was previously owned by the late Ginga Waterai, and recently Shiori Kaidai.

Ryo Kaidai is Arato's classmate, who follows the "Lacia-class hIE Escape Incident" with keen interest. He is the eldest son of the founder of Memeframe. He has a younger sister named Shiori Kaidai, and he currently owns the Type-004 Lacia-series, Methode.

A classmate of Arato's. He works for the terrorist organization 'Antibody Network', after making first contact with the Lacia-class hIE, Kouka. Because of his gentle soul, he is easily swayed and conflicted on whether he should finish tasks with brutality.

Yuka is Arato's little sister, and one of the female protagonists of the series. She grows to be fond of Lacia, of whom Arato brought her into his home after his near-death experience.

Ryo's younger sister.

Kengo's younger sister.

Media

Print
Satoshi Hase serialized the novel, with illustrations by Supercell member Redjuice, in Kadokawa Shoten's Newtype magazine in from 2011 to 2012.  The novel was compiled and published in book form on October 10, 2012. In 2013, Tokyo Otaku Mode began hosting an English translation of the novel, with animated versions of Redjuice's illustrations done by Wit Studio and animator Satoshi Kadowaki. During their panel at Anime Expo 2019, J-Novel Club announced a partnership with Tokyo Otaku Mode to release the novel in North America.

The novel has inspired three separate manga series. Kagura Uguisu published the two-volume manga series Beatless: Dystopia in Kadokawa's shōnen manga magazine Monthly Shōnen Ace between 2012 and 2013. A single-volume four-panel spin-off manga, titled Beatless, was published by Kila.  , a spin-off manga series written by Gun Snark and illustrated by Mitsuru Ohsaki, was launched on Kadokawa's Famitsu Comic Clear website on April 11, 2014, with a preview chapter having been published on March 14. It has been compiled into eight volumes.

Anime
A 24-episode anime television series adaptation aired from January 13 to September 28, 2018. Episodes 21-24 are also referred to as Beatless: Final Stage. The series is directed by Seiji Mizushima at Diomedéa and written by Tatsuya Takahashi and Gō Zappa, with character designs by Hiroko Yaguchi. The first opening theme is "Error" by Garnidelia and the first ending theme is "Primalove" by ClariS. The second opening theme is "Truth." by TrySail, and the second ending theme is "Shapeless" by Tokyo Performance Doll. The series is streaming exclusively on Amazon Video worldwide.

Notes

References

External links

 

Animeism
Cyberpunk anime and manga
Diomedéa
J-Novel Club books
Japanese science fiction novels
Japanese serial novels
Kadokawa Dwango franchises
Kadokawa Shoten
Kadokawa Shoten manga
Shōnen manga